Cavendishia is a genus of about 100 species of woody perennial plants, many of which are epiphytic. The genus is native to tropical South America and Central America.

Species

References 

 Germplasm Resources Information Network: Cavendishia

Vaccinioideae
Ericaceae genera